Coven is an American rock band formed in Chicago the late 1960s. They had a top 40 hit in 1971 with the song "One Tin Soldier", the theme song of the movie Billy Jack.

Coven was composed of vocalist Esther "Jinx" Dawson, bassist Greg "Oz" Osborne, guitarist Chris Neilsen, keyboardist Rick Durrett (later replaced by John Hobbs), and drummer Steve Ross. In addition to pioneering occult rock with lyrics and aesthetics that explicitly dealt in themes of Satanism and witchcraft, they are recognized by metal fans and metal historians as being the band that introduced the "Sign of the horns" to rock, metal and pop culture, as seen on their 1969 debut album release Witchcraft Destroys Minds & Reaps Souls.

History 

Dawson and Osborne, after playing together in the group Him, Her and Them, formed Coven with Ross in Chicago in the late 1960s. In 1967 and 1968 they toured, playing concerts with artists including Jimmy Page's Yardbirds, the Alice Cooper band, and Vanilla Fudge. Coven signed with Mercury Records and released their debut album, Witchcraft Destroys Minds & Reaps Souls in 1969.

The music on the album was considered underground rock; what made it distinctive was the heavy emphasis on diabolical subject matter, including songs such as "The White Witch of Rose Hall" (based on the story of Annie Palmer), "For Unlawful Carnal Knowledge", "Black Sabbath" and "Dignitaries of Hell". The album concluded with a 13-minute track of chanting and Satanic prayers called "Satanic Mass" (written by their producer, Bill Traut, of Dunwich Productions, and described as "the first Black Mass to be recorded, either in written words or in audio"). This Satanic Mass was also the first time Latin phrases such as "Ave Satanas" were used in occult rock music, and later Satanic and black metal bands continued this innovation (see List of songs with Latin lyrics for some examples). Also included inside the album was Coven's infamous Black Mass poster, showing members of the group displaying the sign of the horns as they prepared for a Satanic ritual over a nude Dawson lying on an altar.

Unwanted publicity came to the band in the form of a sensationalistic Esquire magazine issue entitled "Evil Lurks in California" (Esquire, March 1970), which linked counterculture interest in the occult to Charles Manson and the Tate-La Bianca murders, while also mentioning the Witchcraft album and its Black Mass material. As a result, the album was pulled from circulation.

Dawson recorded the vocals for "One Tin Soldier", the title theme for the 1971 film Billy Jack, which was credited as "sung by Coven".  The song, which went on to reach number 26 on the Billboard Hot 100, was written by Dennis Lambert and Brian Potter and was originally released by The Original Caste in 1969. Coven's version also reached the top 10 in Cash Box and was named the Number 1 Most Requested Song in 1971 and 1973 by American Radio Broadcasters. It also peaked at number 45 in Australia. In 1971, the band released a self-titled album that included "One Tin Soldier". Their third album, Blood on the Snow, was produced by Shel Talmy and released by Buddah Records in 1974. Disney produced a music video for the title track.

After multiple unlicensed CD releases of the Witchcraft album over the years, it was officially released on the band's own Nevoc label in 2007. The following year, Coven released Metal Goth Queen: Out of the Vault 1976–2007 on Nevoc, an album composed of previously unreleased recordings. Jinx, an album of new recordings, was self-released on Nevoc in 2013. Jinx Dawson recruited a new line up of musicians in late 2016 - early 2017 in order to perform at Roadburn Festival in Tilburg, The Netherlands on April 20, 2017. This was Coven's first performance in Europe.

Discography

 Witchcraft Destroys Minds & Reaps Souls (1969, Mercury)
 Coven (1971, MGM)
 Blood on the Snow (1974, Buddah)
 Metal Goth Queen: Out of the Vault 1976–2007 (2008, Nevoc)
 Jinx (2013, Nevoc)
 Light The Fire EP (2016, Nevoc)

References

External links

Acid rock music groups
American psychedelic rock music groups
American occultists
Musical groups established in 1969
1969 establishments in Illinois
Musical groups disestablished in 1975
1975 disestablishments in Illinois
Musical groups reestablished in 2007
Musical groups from Chicago
Mercury Records artists
MGM Records artists
Buddah Records artists
Occult rock musical groups